Jedovnice is a market town in the Blansko District in the South Moravian Region of the Czech Republic. It has about 2,800 inhabitants.

Geography
It lies in the Drahany Highlands. Small western part of the municipal territory lies in the Moravian Karst Protected Landscape Area. The eastern part of the territory comprises the Rakovec Nature Reserve.

Jedovnice lies on the Jedovnický Stream with a set of ponds. The largest of the ponds is Olšovec, which borders the built-up area. The pond was first mentioned in 1371. It is a major recreation centre.

History

The first written mention of Jedovnice is from 1251. In 1335, the settlement was promoted to a market town. The most important owners of the estate were the Salm family, who acquired Jedovnice in 1743. The founded hammer mills here and contributed to the development of Jedovnice. They owned the market town until the establishment of an independent municipality in 1848.

In the first half of the 20th century, Jedovnice became a popular holiday destination.

Demographics

Culture
In 2018 it was the venue for the Linux Bier Wanderung.

Sights
The parish Church of Saint Peter and Paul was built in the current Baroque form in 1783–1785 by extension and reconstruction of the original Gothic building. It is remarkable for the modern interior made by Mikuláš Medek,  Jan Koblasa, Josef Istler, Karel Nepraš and Ludvík Kolek in 1963–1976.

Twin towns – sister cities

Jedovnice is twinned with:
 Aschheim, Germany

References

External links

Market towns in the Czech Republic
Populated places in Blansko District